2009–10 Syed Mushtaq Ali Trophy was the second edition of the Syed Mushtaq Ali Trophy competition, an Indian domestic team only Twenty20 cricket tournament in India. It was contested by 26 teams. Initially 27 teams had to play on the tournament, but finally Rajasthan did not play. Maharashtra emerged as winners of the tournament.

Group stage

South Zone

East Zone

North Zone

West Zone

Central Zone

Knockout stage

Final

References

External links
 Series home at ESPN Cricinfo
 Squads

Syed Mushtaq Ali Trophy
Syed Mushtaq Ali Trophy